The women's 10,000 metres at the 2013 World Championships in Athletics was held at the Luzhniki Stadium on 11 August.

At the beginning it was Shalane Flanagan who took out the pace, with the African contenders content to let her.  Following was Hitomi Niiya, who after a brief rainshower took over the lead as Flanagan faded after the first 8 laps.  Niiya held the lead until the final 600 meters as the pack dwindled.  That was when Tirunesh Dibaba began to race seriously.  Followed by her teammate, Belaynesh Oljira, the two Ethiopians picked up the pace with Kenyans Gladys Cherono and Emily Chebet giving chase, Niiya couldn't handle the acceleration and disappeared from contention.  Even Oljira couldn't keep up with Dibaba's smooth pace to gold, she was passed by Cherono who gave a game effort and picked up the silver.

Records
Prior to the competition, the records were as follows:

Qualification standards

Schedule

Results

Final
The final was started at 21:05.

References

External links
10000 metres results at IAAF website

10000
10,000 metres at the World Athletics Championships
2013 in women's athletics